Broad and Cassel LLP is a full-service law firm with ten offices located throughout the State of Florida. Founded by Alvin Cassel and Shepard Broad in 1946. The firm has a variety of practice areas including: Corporate and Securities; Construction Law and Litigation; Real Estate Development; Estate Planning and Trusts; Commercial Litigation; Health Law; Law Use and Environmental Law; Taxation; Bankruptcy and Creditors’ Rights; Labor and Employment; Eminent Domain; Auto Dealership/Repair Shop Defense and Regulatory Compliance; Appellate Law; Public Finance and Capital Projects; and White Collar Crime and Civil Fraud Defense.  Senator Marco Rubio, Congresswoman Kathy Castor and Congressman Ted Deutch, have been affiliated with the firm.

Lewis Horwitz joined the firm as a partner in 1948 to handle litigation.  The three of them remained together at Broad and Cassel for more than 30 years. In 1968, Norman Broad, Shepard’s nephew, became managing partner and led the Firm into an era of strategic growth, opening offices in Orlando, Boca Raton, West Palm Beach and Fort Lauderdale in a 12-year span. Offices later opened in Tallahassee, Tampa, Destin, Jacksonville and Palm Beach.

Broad and Cassel LLP and Nelson Mullins Riley & Scarborough LLP combined into a super-regional law firm on August 1, 2018 in Florida, known as Nelson Mullins Broad and Cassel. The combined firm has more than 750 attorneys and professionals operating in 25 offices across 11 states and Washington, DC.

Awards and recognition
Firm attorneys have been named as the "Best Lawyers in America" by Woodward & White, Florida Super Lawyers, Florida Trend Legal Elite, "Top Lawyers" by South Florida Legal Guide and many have achieved an AV-rating with Martindale-Hubbell. Broad and Cassel is consistently recognized by Chambers USA: A Guide to America's Leading Business Lawyers and is regularly included among the "Best Law Firms" by U.S. News and "Top Law Firms" by the South Florida Legal Guide.

See also 
Fisher Potter Hodas
Holland & Knight

References

Law firms based in Florida
Law firms established in 1946